The Minister for Arts, Culture and Heritage is a minister in the government of New Zealand with responsibility for arts, culture, heritage, and broadcasting, and is in charge of the Ministry for Culture and Heritage. The position was established in 1975 as Minister for the Arts.

The present Minister is Carmel Sepuloni. Willow-Jean Prime is associate minister for arts, culture and heritage.

History
The Third National Government of New Zealand established a ministerial portfolio with responsibility for the arts at its election in 1975. This reflected a growing interest of the Government in the cultural sector. The name of the portfolio changed to "Minister for Arts and Culture" in 1987. During this period, the portfolio was serviced by the Department of Internal Affairs.

A separate portfolio, Minister responsible for the New Zealand Symphony Orchestra, was established in 1987. This was held first by Jonathan Hunt (24 August 1987 – 9 February 1990) and subsequently by Margaret Austin (also the Minister for Arts and Culture; 9 February 1990 – 2 November 1990) before being subsumed back into the responsibilities of the Minister for Arts and Culture.

A standalone agency, the Ministry for Cultural Affairs, was established by the Fourth National Government in 1991, which necessitated the change of title to "Minister for Cultural Affairs." With the creation of the Ministry for Culture and Heritage in 1999, which brought together cultural and heritage responsibilities in the same agency, the portfolio title changed to match its department. The present name was adopted in November 1999 at the election of the Fifth Labour Government.

List of Ministers
Key

List of Associate Ministers 
Associate Ministers for Arts, Culture and Heritage have been appointed on occasion since 1999. Their role is to assist the portfolio minister in carrying out tasks related to the portfolio. They may exercise statutory powers or functions delegated on behalf of the minister under the Constitution Act 1986.

References

External links
New Zealand Ministry for Culture and Heritage

Arts, Culture and Heritage
Arts in New Zealand